Middlesbrough College, located on one campus at Middlehaven, Middlesbrough, North Yorkshire, England, is the largest college on Teesside.

Admissions
It provides predominantly further education, but also selected higher education provision, and until 2008, existed on four different sites across the town (Marton, Acklam, Kirby and Longlands). Relocation to Middlehaven was one of Tees Valley Regeneration's major redevelopment projects.

It is situated just north of the A66 and Middlesbrough town centre, next to Middlesbrough Dock and the dock tower, and close to the Transporter Bridge and Middlesbrough FC's Riverside Stadium.

Student numbers during the 2013/14 college year were 14,232 (2013/14 annual report).

History and estates

Former schools
Three of the pre-2008 sites were those of the former grammar schools when run by the Middlesbrough Education Committee:
 Middlesbrough High School (Boys) – opened in October 1870 as a fee-paying school.
 Middlesbrough High School (Girls) – opened in August 1874. A joint new building was opened on Albert Road  in 1877, but the boys and girls were taught separately. The central Middlesbrough site was in use until 1960, and then moved to Marton Road.
 the girls-only Kirby Grammar School - opened in October 1911 on the corner of Roman Road and Orchard Road in Linthorpe.
 the boys-only Acklam Hall Grammar School for Boys – opened in September 1935 when the numbers at Middlesbrough High School for Boys outgrew the capacity of the buildings.

Middlesbrough High School for Girls had 450 girls in the 1950s, and 600 in 1962. Middlesbrough High School for Boys had around 450 boys in the 1950s, and 600 in the mid-1960s. The boys' and girls' schools, both three-form entry schools, merged in September 1967 to form Middlesbrough High School, an ages 13–18 comprehensive with around 1,200 boys and girls and 500 in the sixth form. Middlesbrough High School became Middlesbrough and Marton Sixth Form College in 1974. In April 1974, the school had been taken over by the County of Cleveland (Cleveland County Council).

Acklam Hall Grammar School had 600 boys in the mid-1960s. It merged with Kirby to form Acklam High School, a comprehensive school, in 1968. This school then further changed in 1974 to Acklam Sixth Form College and King's Manor 11–16 School. The King's Manor School suffered a fire and moved across the road, Hall Drive, to share a site with Hall Garth School (now Hall Garth Community Arts College).

Former colleges
Longlands College of Further Education was on Douglas Street which opened in 1957, and at first partly used by the Constantine Technical College. It was near the junction of Marton Road (A172) and Longlands Road (A1085) just west of North Ormesby.

Kirby College of Further Education was separate and established in 1968 on Roman Road. It had departments such as Food and Fashion, Catering, Hairdressing, and Business Studies, and taught single O-level subjects (re-takes or part-time). It also offered A level programmes in the late 1970s

Foundation through two mergers
Teesside Tertiary College was created on 1 August 1995 by the merger of Longlands College of Further Education and Marton Sixth Form College, and was based on Marton Road next to the James Cook University Hospital.

Middlesbrough College was formed when Kirby College of Further Education merged with Acklam Sixth Form College, also on 1 August 1995.

From 1992, these two colleges had been funded by the Further Education Funding Council for England. In 1995, Teesside Tertiary College offered £1,200 for every person signing up for A-level course who had eight A grades at GCSE.

Merger and move to new site

Middlesbrough College merged with Teesside Tertiary College on 1 August 2002, with it now being spread over four sites. Since 2001, these colleges had been funded by the Learning and Skills Council for England. Once the merger was complete, planning began for the relocation to a single site at Middlehaven in central Middlesbrough. Building work for the new college building at Middlehaven began in early 2007. In September 2008, the four separate sites were eventually consolidated onto a single site with the opening of the new £68 million Middlesbrough college building. The Middlehaven site was officially opened on 12 February 2009 by Prince Andrew, Duke of York, although the plaque marking the opening was removed in January 2022.

The Middlehaven site has since grown with the opening of new college buildings adjacent to the main building. MC6 & MC SPORT (a sixth form centre & sports academy) opened in October 2012, and MC STEM (science, technology, engineering & maths) was officially opened by Professor Brian Cox in November 2015.

Former sites
Middlesbrough college's four previous sites were:
 Marton Road (Marton Campus)
 Douglas Street (Longlands Campus)
 Roman Road (Kirby Campus)
 Hall Drive (Acklam Campus)

Most of the  Marton Campus is in the process of becoming a housing estate with 275 houses being built by Taylor Woodrow. The remainder of the site was encompassed into part of the new Middlesbrough Sports Village with an outdoor velodrome replacing the football pitches.

The  Kirby Campus now has 84 houses and 53 apartments built on it by Taylor Woodrow. The former Kirby Grammar School has become 21 apartments. The  Longlands Campus has become 104 houses built by Taylor Woodrow. This includes the former playing field and sports hall.

Curriculum
Courses range from university academics to vocational education. Selected higher education courses exist by virtue of an indirectly funded partnership arrangement with the Open University.

Alumni

Acklam Hall Grammar School for Boys
 Roland Carl Backhouse, Professor of Computing, University of Nottingham
 Strachan Heppell CB, chairman of the European Medicines Agency from 1994 to 2000
 Air Vice-Marshal Robert Hooks CBE
 Adm Sir Michael Livesay, (first) Commander of HMS Invincible from 1979 to 1982
 Colin Mays CMG, High Commissioner to the Seychelles from 1983 to 1986, and Bahamas from 1986 to 1991
 Alan Old, England rugby union international from 1972–1978
 Chris Old, England cricket international from 1972–1981
 Brian Tanner CBE, chief executive of Somerset County Council from 1990 to 1997.

Middlesbrough High School for Boys
 Robert Cant, Labour MP from 1966 to 1983 for Stoke-on-Trent Central
 Sir Fife Clark, Director General from 1954 to 1971 of the Central Office of Information, and former President of the Institute of Public Relations
 Commodore John Dobson CBE DSC
 George Elliott (footballer)
 Sir Sadler Forster CBE, Chairman from 1960 to 1970 of the English Industrial Estates Corporation (became English Partnerships)
 Sir John Watson Gibson CBE, civil engineer, worked with Pauling & Co. to build the Jebel Aulia Dam, and in the war designed the breakwaters for the Mulberry harbours
 Sir Denis Hamilton DSO, Editor of The Sunday Times, Chairman from 1979 to 1985 of Reuters and President from 1981 to 1983 of the Commonwealth Press Union
 Prof Chris Lamb, John Innes Professor of Biology, and director from 1999 to 2009 of the John Innes Centre at the University of East Anglia
 Marcus Langley, former aircraft designer for de Havilland in the 1930s who worked with A. H. Tiltman, and became Chief Designer at British Aircraft Manufacturing in 1936, who produced important work in the early 1930s on metal aircraft construction
 J. D. Mackie, historian and Professor of Scottish History and Literature from 1930 to 1957 at the University of Glasgow
 Sir Edward Pickering, editor from 1957 to 1962 of the Daily Express, and chairman from 1970 to 1974 of IPC Magazines
 Dr Alan Robertson CBE, pesticide chemist, and chairman from 1981 to 1983 of the British Nutrition Foundation
 Cyril Smith OBE, Professor of Pianoforte from 1934 to 1974 at the Royal College of Music
 Norman Thompson CBE, managing director from 1971 to 1974 of Cunard Line
 Bob Mortimer, Comedy Actor

Middlesbrough High School for Girls
 Gillian Hush, BBC Radio 4 producer, notably of Desert Island Discs

Kirby Grammar School
 Anna Raeburn, agony aunt and radio broadcaster. 
 Professor Sue Scott, Feminist and Sociologist, Managing Editor of Discover Society.

See also
 The former Middlesbrough College of Education on Borough Road, a teacher-training college which became part of Teesside University (itself the former Constantine Technical College)
 Redcar & Cleveland College
 Cleveland College of Art and Design

Gallery

References

External links 
 College homepage
 Acklam Through The Ages at BBC Tees.
 Memories of Kirby Malayan Teacher Training College
 Formation of Teesside Tertiary College in 1995
 Formation of the college in 1995
 Merger in 2002

News items
 History of Acklam Hall
 Teesside Tertiary College formed in 1995

Educational institutions established in 1995
Education in Middlesbrough
Further education colleges in North Yorkshire
Further education colleges in the Collab Group
1995 establishments in England